Events in the year 1959 in Brazil.

Incumbents

Federal government
 President: Juscelino Kubitschek
 Vice President: João Goulart

Governors 
 Alagoas: Sebastião Muniz Falcão
 Amazonas: Plínio Ramos Coelho (till 25 March); Gilberto Mestrinho (from 25 March)
 Bahia: Antônio Balbino then Juracy Magalhães 
 Ceará: Flávio Marcílio (until 25 March); Parsifal Barroso (from 25 March)
 Espírito Santo:
 until 31 January: Francisco Lacerda de Aguiar
 31 January-10 October: Carlos Fernando Monteiro Lindenberg  
 from 10 October: Raul Giuberti
 Goiás: José Ludovico de Almeida (until 31 January); José Feliciano Ferreira (from 31 January)
 Maranhão: 
 Mato Grosso: João Ponce de Arruda
 Minas Gerais: José Francisco Bias Fortes 
 Pará: Magalhães Barata (until 29 May); Luís de Moura Carvalho (from 29 May)
 Paraíba: Pedro Gondim 
 Paraná: Moisés Lupion
 Pernambuco: 
 until 31 January: Otávio Correia de Araújo
 31 January-31 March: Constantino Carneiro de Albuquerque Maranhão 
 from 31 March: Cid Sampaio 
 Piauí: Jacob Gaioso e Almendra (until 25 March); Chagas Rodrigues (from 25 March)
 Rio de Janeiro: 
 until 30 January: Togo Barros 
 30 January-31 January: Osmar Serpa de Carvalho
 from 31 January: Roberto Silveira                                                              
 Rio Grande do Norte: Dinarte de Medeiros Mariz 
 Rio Grande do Sul: Ildo Meneghetti (until 25 March); Leonel Brizola (from 25 March)
 Santa Catarina: Heriberto Hülse 
 São Paulo: Jânio Quadros (until 31 January); Carlos Alberto Alves de Carvalho Pinto (from 31 January)
 Sergipe: Leandro Maciel (until 31 January); Luís Garcia (from 31 January)

Vice governors
 Alagoas: Sizenando Nabuco de Melo 
 Bahia: Orlando Moscoso (from 7 April)
 Ceará: Wilson Gonçalves (from 25 March)
 Espírito Santo: Adwalter Ribeiro Soares (until 31 January); Raul Giuberti (from 31 January)
 Goiás: Bernardo Sayão Carvalho Araújo (until 31 January); João de Abreu (from 31 January)
 Maranhão: Alexandre Alves Costa 
 Mato Grosso: Henrique José Vieira Neto 
 Minas Gerais: Artur Bernardes Filho 
 Paraíba: Pedro Gondim 
 Pernambuco: Pelópidas da Silveira (from 15 December)
 Piauí: Francisco Ferreira de Castro (until 25 March); Tibério Nunes (from 25 March)
 Rio de Janeiro: Roberto Silveira (until 25 March); Celso Peçanha (from 25 March)
 Rio Grande do Norte: José Augusto Varela 
 Santa Catarina: vacant
 São Paulo: Porfírio da Paz 
 Sergipe: José Machado de Souza (until 31 January); Dionísio Machado (from 31 January)

Events

Deaths 

 February 20  – Gregório Bondar, Russian-Brazilian agronomist (b. 1881)
 August 16 – José Pessoa Cavalcanti de Albuquerque,  Brazilian military officer (b.  1885)
 November 17 – Heitor Villa-Lobos, Brazilian composer (b. 1887)

References

See also 
1959 in Brazilian football

 
1950s in Brazil
Years of the 20th century in Brazil
Brazil
Brazil